Geastrum elegans is an inedible species of mushroom belonging to the genus Geastrum, or earthstar fungi.

elegans
Fungi described in 1842
Fungi of Europe
Inedible fungi